"Jerry Sprunger" is a song by Canadian rapper Tory Lanez and American rapper T-Pain. It was released on November 8, 2019 as the lead single from the former's fourth studio album, Chixtape 5. The song samples T-Pain's hit single "I'm Sprung" (2005), and its title is a reference to British-American television personality Jerry Springer.

Background 
Tory Lanez teased the song in early December 2018, when he posted a video of T-Pain's first reaction to the track on Twitter. It was released on November 8, 2019 as the single from his album Chixtape 5, which was released a week later.

Music video 
The official music video was released on November 8, 2019. It features Tory Lanez taking a walk down memory lane in the nostalgic clip featuring T-Pain. In keeping with the theme, Lanez rocks throwback looks from the early 2000s including do-rags, bandanas, oversized T-shirts, and jerseys while hosting a barbecue on the front lawn of his house with bikini-clad guests.

Charts

Weekly charts

Year-end charts

Certifications

References 

2019 singles
2019 songs
Tory Lanez songs
T-Pain songs
Songs written by T-Pain
Songs written by Tory Lanez